The Ford Fox platform is an automobile platform that was used by Ford Motor Company. Introduced for compact sedans in the 1978 model year, the Fox architecture was utilized for a wide variety of configurations for Ford and Lincoln-Mercury vehicles. In its original form, the platform was used through the 1993 model year; a substantial redesign of the Ford Mustang extended its life into the 21st century, ending production in 2004.  Produced across 26 model years, the Fox platform is the second-longest car architecture ever designed by Ford Motor Company (behind the Panther platform, 33 model years).

Designed to be relatively lightweight and simple, the Fox platform was initially developed to replace several derivatives of the Ford Falcon compact architecture dating from 1960. For 1978, the Ford Fairmont and Mercury Zephyr were the first models derived from the chassis, replacing the Ford Maverick and Mercury Comet. As downsizing expanded into the intermediate segment, the Fox platform came into use for mid-size applications, replacing the larger Ford Torino chassis. While best known for underpinning the Ford Mustang pony car, the Fox platform also saw use in personal luxury segments, underpinning coupes for all three Ford divisions.

During the mid-1980s, the usage of the Fox platform began to decline as Ford transitioned its compact and mid-size vehicle lines to front-wheel drive. After the 1992 model year, the Ford Mustang was the sole model to use the chassis. For 2005, the fifth-generation Ford Mustang adopted the rear-wheel drive D2C platform, the fifth and final vehicle architecture developed as a Fox-platform replacement.

Background and development
In the American automotive industry, 1973 marked a significant period of transition. In May, the EPA released the first comprehensive list of fuel economy data; in addition for providing information for consumers, the data was required to establish protocols for CAFE and gas-guzzler taxes.

Under chairman/CEO Henry Ford II and president Lee Iaccoca, several changes were made at the executive level of Ford Motor Company. William O. Bourke, ex-chairman of Ford of Europe and one-time managing director of Ford of Australia, was made executive vice president of North American Operations; Robert Alexander, previously with Ford of Europe as vice president in charge of car development, was moved to same position in the United States. Hal Sperlich was Ford Vice President of Product Planning and Research. 

A proponent of downsizing, Sperlich conceived of a "World Car" that could be sold in both Europe and North America as a solution to the needs of the various divisions. At the time, the Ford small-car product line included the subcompact Pinto and the Mustang II and the compact Maverick; while the Mustang II was several months from release, the Maverick was derived from the Falcon. Lincoln-Mercury sold no small cars of its own, importing the Capri from Ford of Europe. Ford of Europe sold the Escort as its smallest car; Ford UK sold the Cortina while Ford of Germany sold the Taunus

Fox platform development 
In December 1973, Lee Iacocca formally approved development of the Fox platform. Sharing its name with the Audi Fox (although not named after it), Ford executives experienced with the automotive industry outside the United States sought to benchmark a new design from a popular European subcompact design.

Development started in early 1973 on both a short-wheelbase version to replace the Pinto/Cortina/Taunus lines and a long-wheelbase version that would become the Fairmont. Although the Fairmont would be the first Fox-based car to reach the market, development was guided by an anticipated sport coupe to be based on the new platform.

By 1974 the difficulties faced in meeting the conflicting regulatory requirements in different markets and differing production methods used by the various divisions had killed the world-car idea. While unable to replace the Cortina/Taunus, the Fox platform remained a multiple-wheelbase design, as the short-wheelbase version remained in development to replace the Mustang II. In 1975 North American Automobile Operations took over development of the Fox platform from Sperlich's Product Planning and Research group.

The first running Fox (Fairmont) prototype was a Cortina with a modified suspension, using MacPherson struts and torsion bars. The torsion bars would not appear in the final version.

Chassis overview 
The Fox platform, like most compact and mid-size cars of the late 1970s, was designed with a rear-wheel drive layout. In contrast to the full-size Fords and Mercurys of the time, the Fox platform used unibody construction.

The Fox platform used MacPherson strut front suspension, continuing the use of a live rear axle suspension configuration. Initially configured with rear drum brakes, four-wheel disc brakes were added to higher-performance vehicles, including the Continental Mark VII, Ford Mustang SVO, 1994–2004 Ford Mustang, and the Ford Thunderbird Turbo Coupe.

Due to the use of strut front suspension, the Fox platform was designed with a wider engine bay than its Falcon-chassis predecessor. As a result, the chassis was flexible in its use of longitudinal engines, accommodating a wide variety of powertrains, including four-cylinder (naturally-aspirated and turbocharged), inline-6, V6, and V8 engines, ranging from a 2.3L inline-4 to a 5.8L V8 (the most powerful Fox-platform car is the 2003-2004 Mustang SVT Cobra with a 390 hp supercharged 4.6L V8). To further improve the fuel economy of Lincoln Fox-platform vehicles in the 1980s, the platform was adapted for the use of BMW diesel inline-6 engines.

The Fox platform was produced in four separate wheelbases, 100.5 inches (for the Ford Mustang/Mercury Capri; lengthened to 101.3 for the SN95 redesign), 104.2 inches (1983–1988 Thunderbird/Cougar), 105.5 inches ("standard"; sedans/wagons), and 108.5 inches ("long"; 1980 Thunderbird/Cougar XR7/ Continental Mark VII/ Lincoln Mark VII/ Lincoln Continental).

Design history

1983 model year changes
During the early 1980s, the Fox platform would be involved in major changes to many Ford nameplates. In the marketplace, redesigns of the Ford Granada, Ford Thunderbird, and Mercury Cougar had been poorly received by consumers, leading to a collapse in sales for all three nameplates from 1980 to 1982. In addition, fuel prices had stabilized to the point where consumers had shifted back to full-size cars, leading the company to postpone its planned discontinuation of the full-size Panther-platform vehicles. To rectify the sales collapse and capitalize on the move to full-size vehicles, Ford began a major model shift of many of its best-selling vehicle nameplates in all three divisions.

For 1981, Lincoln saw the first changes, as the Lincoln Continental was rechristened the Lincoln Town Car; the Lincoln Continental nameplate went on hiatus until it reappeared on a Fox platform mid-size sedan for the 1982 model year (again giving Lincoln a Cadillac Seville competitor). To eliminate further duplication, the Continental Mark VI lived out its model cycle and was replaced by the far more contemporary Mark VII for 1984.

For 1983, the Ford and Mercury product ranges saw a number of extensive changes. To move its full-size nameplates upmarket, the Ford LTD Crown Victoria and Mercury Grand Marquis became the sole full-size sedans, while the LTD and Marquis nameplates were moved to the mid-size Fox platform as restyled versions of the Granada and Cougar sedan and wagon to replace those slow selling models. To reverse the sales collapse of the Ford Thunderbird and Mercury Cougar (now solely a coupe), Ford redesigned the two coupes with radical new aerodynamic bodystyling.

The revision effectively tripled the size of the Lincoln model range while eliminating the duplication of several Ford/Mercury vehicles (the Ford Fairmont/Granada and Mercury Zephyr/Cougar sedan and wagon); the mid-size Fairmont/Zephyr were replaced by the compact Ford Tempo/Mercury Topaz for 1984 and the Cougar reverted to its coupe-only bodystyle.

SN-95

By the early 1990s, the Ford Mustang had become the sole model produced on the Fox platform. For the 1994 model year, as the Mustang underwent a major redesign (under the body family program code name Fox-4), the Fox platform itself saw major changes to its architecture. As part of the upgrade, most of its parts were redesigned carrying over only the floor pan and front suspension cross member with major changes to the suspension and improvements to noise, vibration, and harshness (NVH); the updated Mustang-specific platform became known as the SN-95 platform.

The 2003–2004 Mustang SVT Cobra became the ultimate development of the Fox/SN95 platform, with a 390 hp supercharged 4.6L DOHC V8. The SN95 platform would be produced for 11 years, extending the life of the Fox platform to 26 years of production. For 2005, the Mustang was completely redesigned, using the all-new Ford D2C platform.

Discontinuation 
As the company entered the 1980s, Ford became part of a growing trend among automobile manufacturers using front-wheel drive in its vehicles. As part of the 1983 changes to the Ford product range, the Ford Fairmont and Mercury Zephyr were phased out in favor of the front-wheel drive Ford Tempo/Mercury Topaz, introduced as 1984 models and based on a long-wheelbase variation of the Ford Escort platform.

Introduced as 1983 models, the Ford LTD and Mercury Marquis were replaced after the end of their short 1986 model year run by the Ford Taurus and Mercury Sable. As the Lincoln Continental shifted to front-wheel drive after the 1987 model year, sedan production of the Fox platform ended.

For 1989, Ford moved the Thunderbird and the Mercury Cougar to the all-new MN12 platform; while still rear-wheel drive, the new chassis introduced a number of suspension advances over the Fox platform. As the Lincoln Mark VII was replaced by the Mark VIII for 1993, the Ford Mustang became the sole Fox-platform produced by Ford.

Vehicles
In total, fifteen distinct vehicles were produced on the Ford Fox platform, with the Ford Fairmont, Mercury Zephyr, Ford Durango, Ford Mustang SVO, and Continental/Lincoln Mark VII produced exclusively on the architecture. The platform would be produced in a variety of body styles, including two-door and four-door sedans, two-door coupes, three-door hatchbacks, five-door station wagons, two-door convertibles (marking the return of the bodystyle to Ford), and a two-door coupe utility (the last coupe utility produced by Ford in North America).

References

Fox